This is a discography for Mudvayne, an American heavy metal band. Formed in Peoria, Illinois, their discography consists of five studio albums, one live album, one compilation album, three EPs, thirteen singles, two video albums, and seventeen music videos.

The band became popular playing in the Peoria, Illinois underground music scene in the late 1990s, and released an extended play, Kill, I Oughtta (1997), and a successful debut album, L.D. 50 (2000). Mudvayne achieved worldwide critical and commercial success with The End of All Things to Come, Lost and Found, The New Game and a self-titled album.

Albums

Studio albums

Compilation albums

EPs

Songs

Singles

Soundtrack contributions

Videography

Video albums

Music videos

Notes

References 

Heavy metal group discographies
Discographies of American artists